Under Suspicion may refer to:

 Bajo sospecha (Under suspicion), a Spanish crime drama television series
 Under Suspicion (1918 film), an American silent film comedy-mystery directed by Will S. Davis
 Under Suspicion (1919 British film), a British silent drama film directed by Walter West
 Under Suspicion (1928 film), a German silent crime film directed by Constantin J. David
 Under Suspicion (1930 film), an American pre-Code drama film directed by A. F. Erickson
 Under Suspicion (1937 film), an American mystery film directed by Lewis D. Collins
 Under Suspicion (1991 film), a neo noir film directed by Simon Moore
 Under Suspicion (2000 film), an American-French thriller film directed by Stephen Hopkins
 Under Suspicion (TV series), an American police drama television series set in Portland, Oregon
 "Under Suspicion", a season four episode of the American police procedural drama television series CSI: Miami